Alec Segaert (born 16 January 2003) is a Belgian cyclist, who currently rides for UCI ProTeam .

Major results

2021
 1st  Time trial, UEC European Junior Road Championships
 1st Overall Internationale Juniorenrundfahrt
1st Stage 1
 1st Chrono des Nations Juniors
 2nd Paris–Roubaix Juniors
 2nd Time trial, National Junior Road Championships
 3rd  Time trial, UCI Junior Road World Championships
 3rd Overall Driedaagse van Axel
 9th Overall Aubel–Thimister–Stavelot
2022
 1st  Time trial, UEC European Under-23 Road Championships
 1st  Time trial, National Under-23 Road Championships
 1st Piccolo Giro di Lombardia
 1st Chrono des Nations Under-23
 1st Hel van Voerendaal
 1st Memorial Igor Decraene
 1st Stage 1 (TTT) Tour Alsace
 2nd  Time trial, UCI Road World Under-23 Championships
 4th Overall Le Triptyque des Monts et Châteaux

References

External links

2003 births
Living people
Belgian male cyclists